Lossnitz , Loßnitz or Lößnitz can refer to several places in Germany:

Niederlößnitz and Oberlößnitz, two parts of Radebeul
Loßnitz, part of Freiberg, Saxony
Lößnitz, a town in the district Aue-Schwarzenberg
Große Lößnitz, a river in Saxony
Lößnitz (Nebel), a river of Mecklenburg-Vorpommern

See also
Lößnitz tramway, interurban tramway in Saxony
Lößnitzbach, a river in Saxony